Chilli Laugh Story is a 2022 Hong Kong comedy film co-written and directed by Coba Cheng, a debutant director. An amusing and sometimes unexpectedly poignant comedy starring Ronald Cheng, Gigi Leung, Edan Lui, and Sandra Ng, it was initially scheduled to release on 1 February 2022, the first day of Lunar New Year, but it was postponed due to COVID-19 and finally released on 14 July 2022.

The film was invited to 21st New York Asian Film Festival, where it had its international premiere on 20 July and won NYAFF Audience Award.

Synopsis
Enterprising college student and music promoter Coba is working from home like everyone else during the pandemic. The would-be comforts of his situation are disrupted by the constant bickering of his eccentric parents (Ronald Cheng and Gigi Leung). After his paying gig suddenly dries up, Coba happens upon an ingenious get-rich-quick scheme that should also distract mom and dad: bottle and sell his mom’s insanely tasty old-school chili sauce. But online demand unexpectedly outpaces supply, and the whole family must band together to continue cornering the market. Their non-stop slapstick shenanigans spice up the classic Chinese New Year comedy formula, producing a brilliant blend of wacky characters and family team-building that is as scrumptiously mouth-watering as the chili sauce recipe itself. (From New York Asian Film Festival)

Cast
 Edan Lui as Cheung Pak Hin/Coba (張柏軒), main protagonist
 Sandra Ng as Wendy Cheung Wai Yi (張惠儀), Coba's aunt
 Gigi Leung as Rita Chan Mei Jing (陳美貞), Coba's mother
 Ronald Cheng as Alan Cheung Kwok Lun (張國倫), Coba's father 
 Angela Yuen Lai Lam as Sam Li Kai Wai (李家慧), Coba's girlfriend
 Tony Wu Tsz-Tung as Wendy's son
 Helen Tam as Wendy's older sister
 Louis Koo as Ah Sun (cameo)	 	 
 Dee Ho Kai-Wa as a friend/middle school classmate of Coba's	 
 Locker Lam Ka-Hei as a friend/middle school classmate of Coba's
 Matt Chow as a food expert  	 
 Carl Ng as Arnold, the owner of SugerMama
 Yanny Chan as Arnold's secretary
 Lo Hoi-Pang as a hot dog shop owner

Additionally, Louis Koo cameos as Ah Sun, * Kenny Wong cameos as KK, along with Leung Yip, Denis Kwok, and Poki Ng as Dee Ho's fellow members from the boyband Error appearing as a group of youngsters at the hot dog shop. Hui Yin and So Chi Ho, members of the YouTube skit group Trial and Error also make a cameo appearance as the youngsters at the hot dog shop.

Release
The film initially scheduled to release on 1 February 2022 was postponed due to COVID 19 and finally released on 14 July 2022. At the same time, it was invited at the 21st New York Asian Film Festival, where it was screened at Lincoln center on July 20 for its International Premiere, and won the Audience Award. The film was also invited to the 26th Fantasia International Film Festival and was screened on July 31, 2022. Trinity Cine Asia acquired rights for distribution of the film in the United Kingdom and North America. It was released theatrically in the United Kingdom on 15 July and in the United States and Canada on 22 July.

Reception

Box office
The film held 92 priority screenings in Hong Kong from 1 July to 3 July 2022, and most of the screenings were sold out, with a box office collection of HK$1.15 million.

 the film is the 4th highest-grossing, Hong Kong-produced film released in the year 2022 with gross of HK$32,610,384.

Critical response
Edmund Lee of the South China Morning Post rated the film with 3.5 out of 5 stars and wrote, "Anyone seeking a window on life for the past two years in post-protest and mid-pandemic Hong Kong – a vaguely depressing experience – could do worse than watch Chilli Laugh Story.". Leslie Felperin of The Guardian rated the film with 3 stars out of 5 and wrote, "The story sort of lollops along like a big friendly dog, following a predictable trajectory of success and failure."

Accolades

References

External links
 
 
 
 

2022 films
2022 comedy films
2020s Cantonese-language films
Hong Kong comedy films
Films set in Hong Kong
Films postponed due to the COVID-19 pandemic
2022 directorial debut films